Wes McCauley (born January 11, 1972) is a Canadian former professional ice hockey player and current National Hockey League (NHL) referee. He is the son of John McCauley, who was also an NHL referee, and his wife Irene.

A defenceman during his playing career, McCauley became a referee after injury forced his retirement from playing in 1997. He refereed his first NHL regular season game in 2003 and became a full-time NHL referee in 2005. He has refereed eight out of the last ten Stanley Cup Finals (2013 to 2022), missing 2019 due to injury and 2021 due to a positive COVID-19 test.

Early life and amateur career
McCauley was born on January 11, 1972, in Georgetown, Ontario. His father was John McCauley, a former NHL referee and the NHL's Director of Officiating at the time of his death in June 1989.

McCauley entered Michigan State University and played as a defenseman for the university's team, the Spartans. He spent four years playing alongside his best friend Bryan Smolinski and together they co-captained the team in their final year. McCauley won the inaugural Terry Flanagan Memorial Award at the end of his final season in 1993.

Professional playing career
After his first year at Michigan State, McCauley was drafted by the Detroit Red Wings in the 8th round of the 1990 NHL Entry Draft. After graduating from university, he played minor league hockey with the Las Vegas Thunder and Fort Wayne Komets of the International Hockey League, the Knoxville Cherokees of the East Coast Hockey League (ECHL), the Muskegon Fury of the Colonial Hockey League and Milan in the Italian Serie A league. He ended his playing career in 1997 due to injuries.

Officiating career
After retiring from playing, McCauley followed in his father's footsteps by becoming a referee. He started off refereeing minor league matches in Ontario, before progressing to the ECHL. In 2001, he was hired by the NHL to officiate in the second-tier American Hockey League (AHL). While with the AHL, McCauley refereed his first NHL game on January 20, 2003, a 5–1 win to the Columbus Blue Jackets against the visiting Chicago Blackhawks. After being selected to officiate the AHL's Calder Cup Finals in 2004 and 2005, he was promoted to a full-time NHL referee for the 2005–2006 season. After two seasons as a full-time NHL referee, McCauley refereed his first playoff match in the 2007 Stanley Cup playoffs, in the first match of the conference quarterfinal series between the Buffalo Sabres and New York Islanders on April 12, 2007. In June 2013 he was selected as part of the officiating team for the NHL's 2013 Stanley Cup Finals between the Boston Bruins and Chicago Blackhawks. McCauley has subsequently officiated the Stanley Cup Finals in 2014, 2015, 2016, 2017, 2018, 2020 and 2022.  He currently wears uniform number 4. McCauley officiated his 1,000th NHL game on December 23, 2018. When coming to center ice after penalties or video reviews, he is known for his suspenseful announcements of important results.

Personal life
McCauley is married with four children and lives in South Portland, Maine, where his wife Bethany grew up. His younger brother Blaine McCauley also played professional hockey. Wes was one of the referees in Blaine's professional debut in 2000.

References

External links

1972 births
Living people
Detroit Red Wings draft picks
Fort Wayne Komets players
Ice hockey people from Ontario
Knoxville Cherokees players
Las Vegas Thunder players
Muskegon Fury players
National Hockey League officials
Canadian ice hockey defencemen